Oakengates railway station serves the town of Oakengates, Telford and Wrekin, Shropshire, England. It has two platforms.

Rail services are primarily provided by West Midlands Trains seven days a week with Transport for Wales providing a service on late evenings through the week, and a limited service on Sundays. Avanti West Coast do not currently call at Oakengates station.

Between Oakengates and Telford Central is the Oakengates Tunnel.

Oakengates Tunnel
This tunnel was a major problem in the construction of the railway. It delayed the project by three years, between 1846 and 1849. Details of the difficulties include unseasonable weather contained in a report  of 21 August 1848 from Robert Stephenson, Consulting Engineer, and William Baker, the Shropshire Union Railway Engineer. It was originally built for broad-gauge railways.

This tunnel is the only tunnel on the Shrewsbury to Wolverhampton line and the longest of the three railway tunnels presently in use in Shropshire. It stretches for 471 yards.

The tunnel passed under the summit level of the Shropshire Canal and was the scene of a disaster in 1855, when a breach from the canal into the tunnel occurred. The entire summit level emptied into the tunnel, causing flooding in the town, although there were no reports of any personal injury.

An accident occurred at the station on 11 September 1877 when a Great Western train, the 7:40 am from Shrewsbury, arrived at Oakengates station on time at 8:09 am. Its locomotive, no. 153, then exploded due to a boiler failure. The explosion killed the driver, Anthony Robson Potter, and injured several others.

Services
Oakengates is typically served Monday to Sunday by one train per hour in each direction between Birmingham New Street and Shrewsbury via Wolverhampton, with some extra trains at peak times on weekdays. These services are operated by West Midlands Trains under the 'West Midlands Railway' brand using British Rail Class 170 Diesel Multiple Units, which will be replaced by British Rail Class 196 DMUs in 2021. While for the Transport for Wales as of May 2021, the reduced and revised timetable due to the COVID-19 pandemic, the station is only served by one train per day to Shrewsbury (single direction) at very late night. This train operates everyday except Sunday, it is the last departure train service to the northern at the end of the day.

References

Further reading

External links

History of the Railway
Locations from Steam Index

Railway stations in Shropshire
DfT Category F2 stations
Former Great Western Railway stations
Railway stations in Great Britain opened in 1849
Railway stations served by West Midlands Trains
Telford
Railway stations served by Transport for Wales Rail
1849 establishments in England